Thomas Cartwright may refer to:

Thomas Cartwright (architect) (c. 1635–1703), English architect
Thomas Cartwright (theologian) (c. 1535–1603), English Puritan churchman
Thomas Cartwright (bishop) (1634–1689), nonjuring Bishop of Chester
Thomas Cartwright (diplomat) (1795–1850), British envoy to the Netherlands and Sweden
Thomas Cartwright (politician) (1671–1748), English MP for Northamptonshire 1695–1698 and 1701–1748
Tom Cartwright (1935–2007), English cricketer